Mahmudlu is a village in the Jabrayil District of Azerbaijan. It is currently uninhabited.

On October 4, 2020, according to the President of Azerbaijan, the village was captured by the Army of Azerbaijan.

References 

Populated places in Jabrayil District